"Stuttering" is a song by R&B singer Loick Essien. The song features vocals from hip hop group, N-Dubz. The track was the third single released from his upcoming debut studio album, Identity, after it was scrapped. It was released on 4 February 2011 via Sony Music Entertainment. The song entered the UK Singles Chart at number 36, making it his first Top 40 single. A music video was made for the single. It was uploaded to YouTube on 6 January 2011. Essien and two members of N-Dubz, Dappy and Fazer, appear in the video. The song has also been sung by R&B artists Mario and Range.

Track listing

Chart performance

Release history

References

2011 singles
Loick Essien songs
Songs written by Tulisa (singer)
Songs written by Richard Rawson
2010 songs
Songs written by Loick Essien